Stranger Things is an American streaming television series created for Netflix by the Duffer Brothers, which features an ensemble cast. It is set in the fictional rural town of Hawkins, Indiana, in the 1980s. The Hawkins National Laboratory ostensibly performs scientific research for the United States Department of Energy, but secretly conducts experiments on the paranormal and supernatural, frequently employing human subjects. Inadvertently, the laboratory created a portal to an alternate dimension called "the Upside Down". The influence of the Upside Down starts to affect the unknowing residents of Hawkins in calamitous ways. All episodes of the first season were released on Netflix on July 15, 2016, and the second season was released in its entirety on October 27, 2017. A third season was released on July 4, 2019, with the fourth season being released in two volumes on May 27 and July 1, 2022, respectively.

The series has received critical acclaim and numerous accolades for its writing, acting, directing, production values, visual effects, and soundtrack. Stranger Things has been nominated for many awards, including 51 Primetime Emmy Awards (12 wins), four Golden Globe Awards, four Grammy Awards, four Critics' Choice Television Awards (one win), 13 Saturn Awards (four wins), two Producers Guild of America Awards (one win), three Writers Guild of America Awards, and two Peabody Awards (one win). It was also selected by the American Film Institute as one of its top 10 television programs of the year for the series' first two seasons.

The main cast has been nominated for three Screen Actors Guild Award for Outstanding Performance by an Ensemble in a Drama Series nominations, winning in 2017. Millie Bobby Brown is the most nominated member of the cast. Brown, David Harbour, and Winona Ryder have received individual Screen Actors Guild Award nominations for their performances in the series. Brown and Harbour also received two Primetime Emmy Award nominations, while Harbour and Ryder were each nominated for a Golden Globe Award.

Total awards and nominations for the cast

Awards and nominations

Notes

References

External links
 

Awards and nominations
Lists of awards by television series